The 2021 Rugby Europe Under-18 Sevens Trophy was held in Riga, Latvia between 24–25 July. Ukraine won the Championship and Israel were runners-up.

Teams

Pool stages

Pool A

Pool B

Pool C

Finals 
Cup

5th/7th Place Playoff

9th/11th Place Playoff

Final standings

References 

2021
2021 rugby sevens competitions
2021 in European sport
Rugby Europe Under-18